The 1985 Hall of Fame Tennis Championships (also known as the 1985 Volvo Tennis Hall of Fame Championships for sponsorship reasons) was a men's Grand Prix tennis tournament held in Newport, Rhode Island, USA. It was the 10th edition of the tournament and was held from July 6 through July 12, 1985. Unseeded Tom Gullikson won the singles title.

Finals

Singles
 Tom Gullikson defeated  John Sadri 6–3, 7–5
 It was Gullikson's only singles title of his career.

Doubles
 Peter Doohan /  Sammy Giammalva Jr. defeated  Paul Annacone /  Christo van Rensburg 6–1, 6–3

See also
 1985 Virginia Slims of Newport

References

External links
 ITF tournament edition details

Hall Of Fame Tennis Championships, 1985
Hall of Fame Tennis Championships
Tennis tournaments in Rhode Island
Hall of Fame Tennis Championships
Hall of Fame Tennis Championships